David Ajala (born 21 May 1986) is a British actor. He is known for his roles as Manchester Black in Supergirl (20182019), Captain Roy Eris in Nightflyers (2018), and Cleveland "Book" Booker in Star Trek: Discovery (2020present).

Early life 
David Ajala was born in Hackney, London. He is of Nigerian Yoruba origin. He trained at the Anna Scher Theatre. In an interview for Interview Magazine Ajala said: "When I went to secondary school, my maths teacher said I had way too much energy and was too mischievous. He tried to convince me that if I did acting, I'd be popular with the girls".

Career 

On stage Ajala has performed in Nation, A Midsummer Night's Dream with the Royal Shakespeare Company, Hamlet, and as Jim Brown in the European premiere of Kemp Powers.

In film, his first part was in Kidulthood, and he also appears in the sequels, Adulthood and Brotherhood; he has also appeared in The Dark Knight and in major roles in Starred Up and the 2016 Seekers. On TV he has appeared in many series including Doctor Who and in major roles in Black Box, Beowulf: Return to the Shieldlands, Nightflyers, and Falling Water.

Sean 'Mac' McAlister, a character from 2017 video game Need for Speed Payback, is voiced by and modeled after him.

Ajala has appeared as Keith in the BBC Radio 4 dramas Burned To Nothing (2011) and Felix in The Price of Oil: Someone's Making A Killing In Nigeria both by Rex Obano.

In 2018, Ajala was cast in season 4 of Supergirl'', portraying Manchester Black.

Personal life
Ajala is married to presenter and travel agent Terri Martin. They have two sons.

Filmography

Film

Television

Video games

Theatre credits

References

External links

Living people
1986 births
Alumni of the Anna Scher Theatre School
British male film actors
British male television actors
British male voice actors
British male video game actors
Black British male actors
English people of Nigerian descent
English people of Yoruba descent
21st-century British male actors
Male actors from London
People from the London Borough of Hackney